Strange Adventures of Mr. Smith is a 1937 British comedy film directed by Maclean Rogers and starring Gus McNaughton, Norma Varden and Eve Gray. It was a quota quickie made at the Nettlefold Studios in Walton for release by RKO Pictures.

Cast
 Gus McNaughton as Will Smith / Black Patch 
 Norma Varden as Mrs. Broadbent
 Eve Gray as Mrs. Maidie Smith
 Aubrey Mallalieu as Mr. Broadbent
 Bill Shine as Rodney Broadbent
 Hal Walters as Lobby
 Isobel Scaife as Birkenstraw 
 Michael Ripper as Undetermined Role
 John Singer as Boy

References

Bibliography
 Low, Rachael. Filmmaking in 1930s Britain. George Allen & Unwin, 1985.
 Wood, Linda. British Films, 1927-1939. British Film Institute, 1986.

External links

1937 films
British comedy films
1937 comedy films
Films shot at Nettlefold Studios
Films directed by Maclean Rogers
Quota quickies
British black-and-white films
1930s English-language films
1930s British films